The Uru-Muratos are descendants of an old indigenous community in Bolivia, the Urus or Uros. Because of their place of living, the surroundings of Lake Poopó, they were commonly known as the "men of the lake". In 1930, their lands and lake were invaded by the Aymara people. Consequently, most of the Uru-Muratos lost their place as the sole fishermen of the lake, and their economic livelihood and relations with other communities were drastically worsened.

External links
"Los Hombres del Lago", a documentary film by Aaron I. Naar presenting the story of the smallest community of Uru-Muratos, Puñaca Tintamaria. Narrated by the community’s ex-leader, Daniel Moricio Choque, the movie recounts the history of their community, customs, and current problems: their continuous poverty, lack of land and representation, the contamination of Lake Poopó, and the impact of global warming. See a 12 minutes  fragment from the film on YouTube.

Indigenous peoples in Bolivia
Indigenous peoples of the Andes